Jadwiga Kuryluk (25 September 1912 – 30 April 1995) was a Polish film actress. She appeared in more than 30 films and television shows between 1958 and 1987.

Selected filmography
 Tonight a City Will Die (1961)

References

External links

1912 births
1995 deaths
Polish film actresses
Polish stage actresses
People from Skierniewice
Polish television actresses
20th-century Polish actresses